La Pinière is a provincial electoral district in the Montérégie region of Quebec, Canada that elects members to the National Assembly of Quebec. Its territory corresponds to the city of Brossard, less its "P" and "V" sectors that are located north of Autoroute 10 and west of Taschereau Boulevard.

It was created for the 1989 election from part of La Prairie electoral district.

In the change from the 2001 to the 2011 electoral map, its territory was unchanged.

In the change from the 2011 to the 2017 electoral map, it will lose the area around the Champlain Mall to the riding of Laporte.

Members of the National Assembly
This riding has elected the following Members of the National Assembly:

Election results

* Result compared to Action démocratique

|-

|}

|-
 
|Democratic Socialist
|Gabriel Ste-Marie
|align="right"|125
|align="right"|0.33
|align="right"|–
|-
 
|Independent
|Gislaine Langlois
|align="right"|78
|align="right"|0.21
|align="right"|–
|-
 
|Innovateur
|Jean Marie Belin
|align="right"|75
|align="right"|0.20
|align="right"|–
|-
 
|Independent
|Jason Wabha
|align="right"|52
|align="right"|0.14
|align="right"|–
|}

|-

|Natural Law
|Jennyfer Leung
|align="right"|597
|align="right"|1.68
|align="right"|–
|-

|Sovereignty
|Debbie Dutrisac
|align="right"|457
|align="right"|1.29
|align="right"|–
|}

|-

|-

|New Democratic
|Luis Martinez
|align="right"|1,237
|align="right"|4.19
|-

|Parti indépendantiste
|François Gilbert
|align="right"|935
|align="right"|3.17
|}

References

External links
Information
 Elections Quebec

Election results
 Election results (National Assembly)
 Election results (QuébecPolitique)

Maps
 2011 map (PDF)
 2001 map (Flash)
2001–2011 changes (Flash)
1992–2001 changes (Flash)
 Electoral map of Montérégie region
 Quebec electoral map, 2011

Politics of Brossard
Quebec provincial electoral districts